Scott House or Scott Farm may refer to:

United States 
(by state, then city)
 Scott-Yarbrough House, Auburn, Alabama, listed on the National Register of Historic Places (NRHP)
 Leiper-Scott House, Little Rock, Arkansas, listed on the NRHP in Arkansas
 Scott-Davis House, Romance, Arkansas, listed on the NRHP in Arkansas
 Drennen-Scott House, Van Buren, Arkansas, listed on the NRHP in Arkansas
 Robert Scott House, Mesa, Arizona, listed on the NRHP in Arizona
 Hoyt-Scott House, Point Arena, California, listed on the NRHP in California
 Hiram D. Scott House, Scotts Valley, California, listed on the NRHP in California
 Lewis June House, also known as Scott House, in Ridgefield, Connecticut, NRHP-listed
 Josiah Scott House, Annis, Idaho, NRHP-listed
 Scott–Vrooman House, Bloomington, Illinois, NRHP-listed
 Matthew T. Scott House, Chenoa, Illinois, NRHP-listed
 Lyman Scott House, Summer Hill, Illinois, NRHP-listed
 Scott-Lucas House, Morocco, Indiana, listed on the NRHP in Indiana
 Andrew F. Scott House, Richmond, Indiana, listed on the NRHP in Indiana
 Mary A. and Caleb D. Scott House, Des Moines, Iowa, listed on the NRHP in Iowa
 Scott and Wilson Houses District, Lexington, Kentucky, listed on the NRHP in Kentucky
 Scott House (Little Hickman, Kentucky), listed on the NRHP in Kentucky
 John Harvey Scott House, Nicholasville, Kentucky, listed on the NRHP in Kentucky
 Dill Scott House, Somerset, Kentucky, listed on the NRHP in Kentucky
 Thomas Scott House (Gloster, Louisiana), NRHP-listed
 Upton Scott House, Annapolis, Maryland, NRHP-listed
 Robert and Phyllis Scott House, Westminster, Maryland, NRHP-listed
 Eaton–Prescott House, Reading, Massachusetts, NRHP-listed
 Capt. George Scott House, Wiscasset, Maine, NRHP-listed
 Jim Scott Fishhouse, Grand Marais, Minnesota, listed on the NRHP in Minnesota
 Scott-Forhan House, Kalispell, Montana, listed on the NRHP in Flathead County, Montana
 Gen. Winfield Scott House, New York, New York, NRHP-listed
 Scott-Edwards House, New York, New York, NRHP-listed
 Thomas Scott House (Greensboro, North Carolina), listed on the NRHP in North Carolina
 Kerr Scott Farm, Haw River, North Carolina, listed on the NRHP in North Carolina
 Henderson Scott Farm Historic District, Mebane, North Carolina, listed on the NRHP in North Carolina
 McCracken-Scott House, Cambridge, Ohio, listed on the NRHP in Ohio
 George Scott House, Cincinnati, Ohio, NRHP-listed
 Studabaker-Scott House and Beehive School, Greenville, Ohio, NRHP-listed
 William Scott House, Hillsboro, Ohio, listed on the NRHP in Ohio
 John Scott Barn and Granary, Shandon, Ohio, NRHP-listed
 Coleman–Scott House, Portland, Oregon, NRHP-listed
 Leslie M. Scott House, Portland, Oregon, NRHP-listed
 Thomas Scott House (Coatesville, Pennsylvania), NRHP-listed
 David Scott House, Coatesville, Pennsylvania, NRHP-listed
 James Scott House, Pittsburgh, Pennsylvania, NRHP-listed
 Claudius Scott Cottage, Eastover, South Carolina, NRHP-listed
 Scott House (Kingstree, South Carolina), listed on the NRHP in South Carolina
 Andrew Scott House, Culleoka, Tennessee, listed on the NRHP in Tennessee
 Scott Mansion, Tellico Plains, Tennessee, listed on the NRHP in Tennessee
 Scott, Zachary T. and Sallie Lee, Sr. House, Austin, Texas, listed on the NRHP in Texas
 Scott-Majors House, Colorado City, Texas, listed on the NRHP in Texas
 Thomason-Scott House, Era, Texas, listed on the NRHP in Texas
 Wharton–Scott House, Fort Worth, Texas, NRHP-listed
 L. A. Scott House, McKinney, Texas, listed on the NRHP in Texas
 A. M. Scott House, McKinney, Texas, listed on the NRHP in Texas
 Scott-Roden Mansion, Paris, Texas, listed on the NRHP in Texas
 Scott Farm Historic District, Dummerston, Vermont, listed on the NRHP in Vermont
 Scott–Walker House, Saltville, Virginia, NRHP-listed
 William Scott Farmstead, Windsor, Virginia, NRHP-listed
 Scott House (Hampton, Virginia), NRHP-listed
 Scott House (Richmond, Virginia), NRHP-listed

See also
 Thomas Scott House (disambiguation)